The Finding in the Temple, also called Christ among the Doctors or the Disputation (the usual names in art), was an episode in the early life of Jesus depicted in chapter 2 of the Gospel of Luke. It is the only event of the later childhood of Jesus mentioned in a canonical gospel.

Gospel account
Jesus at the age of twelve accompanies Mary and Joseph, and a large group of their relatives and friends to Jerusalem on pilgrimage, "according to the custom" – that is, Passover. On the day of their return, Jesus "lingered", staying in the Temple, but Mary and Joseph thought that he was among their group when he wasn't. Mary and Joseph headed back home and after a day of travel realised Jesus was missing, so they returned to Jerusalem, finding Jesus three days later.
He was found in The Temple in discussion with the elders. They were amazed at his learning, especially given his young age. When admonished by Mary, Jesus replied: "How is it that you sought me? Did you not know that I must be in my Father's house?"

The story was slightly elaborated in later literature, such as the apocryphal 2nd-century Infancy Gospel of Thomas (19:1–12). The losing of Jesus is the third of the Seven Sorrows of Mary, and the Finding in the Temple is the fifth Joyful Mystery of the Rosary.

Catholic Commentary
Friedrich Justus Knecht comments on the loss of Jesus by his parents:
Mary lost Jesus through no fault of her own; but with what sorrow she sought Him, with what joy she found Him! We lose Jesus through our own fault when we separate ourselves from Him by mortal sin. This is the greatest of all misfortunes, for he who has lost Jesus, has lost all, and can never be happy without Him. He to whom this misfortune has happened must seek Jesus with sorrow and tears of penance, and he will find Him again in the Temple (His Church), if he will reconcile himself to God by a good and contrite confession. 

Cornelius a Lapide gives three reasons why Jesus is found asking the teachers questions:
(1.) Because it was fitting that the child should ask questions of these learned men, and not teach them. (2.) To teach the young modesty, and the desire to hear, to question, and to learn, “Lest,” says Bede, “if they will not be disciples of the truth, they become masters of error.” (3.) That, asking them questions, He might be questioned in turn by them, and might teach them by His replies.

In art

This event is frequently shown in art, and was a common component in cycles of the Life of the Virgin as well as the Life of Christ. In early Christian depictions, Jesus is usually shown in the center, seated on a raised dais surrounded by the elders, who are often on stepped benches. The gesture usually made by Jesus, pointing to his upraised thumb (illustration), may be a conventional rhetorical gesture expressing the act of expounding text. These depictions derive from classical compositions of professors of philosophy or rhetoric with their students, and are similar to medieval depictions of contemporary university lectures.

This composition can appear until as late as Ingres (Montauban, Musée Ingres ) and beyond. From the Early Medieval period the moment shown is usually assimilated to the finding itself, by the inclusion of, initially, Mary, and later Joseph as well, usually at the left of the scene. Typically, Jesus and the doctors, intent on their discussions, have not noticed them yet. From the 12th century Jesus is often seated in a large throne-like chair, sometimes holding a book or scroll.

In late medieval depictions, the Doctors, often now carrying or consulting large volumes, may be given specifically Jewish features or dress, and are sometimes overtly anti-Semitic caricatures, like some of the figures in Albrecht Dürer's version in the Thyssen-Bornemisza Museum in Madrid. From the High Renaissance onward, many painters showed a "close-up" of the scene, with Jesus closely surrounded by gesticulating scholars, as in Dürer's version of the subject.

Rembrandt, who enjoyed depicting Jewish elders in the Temple in various subjects, made three etchings of the subject (Bartsch 64–66) as well as one of the much more unusual scene of "Christ returning from the Temple with his parents". The Pre-Raphaelite painter William Holman Hunt painted a version called The Finding of the Saviour in the Temple, now at Birmingham, as one of a number of subjects from Jesus's life, for which he travelled to the Holy Land to study local details.

The subject has attracted few artists since the 19th century, and one of the last notable depictions may be the one painted, as a forgery of a Vermeer, by Han van Meegeren in front of the Dutch police, in order to demonstrate that the paintings he had sold to Hermann Göring were also fake.

Gallery

See also
 Seven Sorrows of Mary

References

General sources 
 G. Schiller, Iconography of Christian Art, Vol. I, 1971 (English translation from German), Lund Humphries, London, pp. 124–5 & figs,

External links 
 

Christian iconography
Gospel episodes
Gospel of Luke
Jesus in art
Joyful Mysteries
Mary, mother of Jesus
Second Temple
Christianity and children
Seven Sorrows of Mary